Dancing with the Stars returned for a fourth series which began on 5 January 2020 on RTÉ One.

Nicky Byrne and Jennifer Zamparelli returned as hosts for a fourth and second series, respectively. The spinoff show Can't Stop Dancing did not return.

Brian Redmond, Loraine Barry and Julian Benson returned as judges.

In November 2019 it was confirmed the professional dancers, Curtis Pritchard, Ksenia Zsikhotska, Valeria Milova and Vitali Kozmin would not be returning for this series. They were replaced by Laura Nolan, Kylee Vincent, Pasquale La Rocca and Stephen Vincent.

The final on 15 March 2020 was won by Lottie Ryan alongside professional dancer Pasquale La Rocca.

Couples
On 1 December 2019, Glenda Gilson was announced as the first celebrity to be taking part. The remaining celebrities were announced across the following week.

Scoring chart 

 Red numbers indicate the couples with the lowest score for each week.
 Green numbers indicate the couples with the highest score for each week.
  the couple eliminated that week
  the returning couple that was called forward and eventually last to be called safe, but was not necessarily in the bottom
  the returning couple that finished in the bottom two and competed in the Dance-Off
  the winning couple
  the runner-up couple

Average chart 
This table only counts for single dances scored on a traditional 30-points scale. It does not include the Team Dance or Marathon scores.

Highest and lowest scoring performances 
The highest and lowest performances in each dance according to the judges' scale are as follows.

Couples' highest and lowest scoring dances

Weekly scores and songs 
Unless indicated otherwise, individual judges scores in the charts below (given in parentheses) are listed in this order from left to right: Brian Redmond, Loraine Barry, Julian Benson.

Week 1
Guest act: Series 3 champions, Mairéad Ronan and John Nolan performing a Viennese Waltz to 'You Are the Reason'.

 Running order (Men)

Week 2
Guest act: Vincent Simone and Ksenia Zsikhotska performed an Argentine Tango to 'La cumparsita'.
Running order (Women)

Week 3

Running order

Week 4: Movie Week

Running order

Week 5: Most Memorable Year Week 

 Running order

Week 6: Switch-Up Week 
Guest act: Julian Benson with Fly Youth performing, 'Cha Cha Boom'.

 Running order

Week 7: Love Week 

 Running order

Dance-Off

Judges' Votes To Save

 Benson: Sinéad & Ryan 
 Redmond: Sinéad & Ryan
 Barry: Did not vote, but would have voted to save Sinéad & Ryan

 Week 8: Orchestra Week Individual judges scores in the charts below (given in parentheses) are listed in this order from left to right: Brian Redmond, Loraine Barry, Darren Bennett.Due to an illness, Darren Bennett filled in for Julian Benson for the night.

All performances this week are accompanied by the RTÉ Concert Orchestra.

 Running order

Dance-Off

Judges' votes to save

 Bennett: Lottie & Pasquale
 Redmond: Lottie & Pasquale
 Barry: Did not vote, but would have voted to save Lottie & Pasquale Week 9: Team Dance Week 

Darren Bennett filled in for Julian Benson for the second week running.

 Running order

Dance-Off

Judges' votes to save

 Bennett: Gráinne & Kai
 Redmond: Gráinne & Kai
 Barry: Did not vote, but would have voted to save Gráinne & Kai Week 10: TV Themes Week 

For the third week running Darren Bennett filled in for Julian Benson.

Guest act: The cast of On Your Feet! performing a Gloria Estefan medley.
Running order

Dance-Off

Judges' votes to save

 Bennett: Lottie & Pasquale
 Redmond: Lottie & Pasquale
 Barry: Did not vote, but would have voted to save Lottie & Pasquale''

Week 11: The Final 
This week was scheduled to be the semifinal, however due to the COVID-19 pandemic, it was announced on the day of that it would be the final and the public would crown their winner.

The couples first performed one unlearned dance followed by a trio dance. For the trio dances each couple was joined by one eliminated pro dancer.

Darren Bennett filled in for Julian Benson for the fourth week running.

Guest act: Nathan Carter performing 'May the Road Rise'.

 Running order

Dance chart 

  Highest scoring dance
  Lowest scoring dance
  No dance performed

References

External links
 Official website

Season 04